Dănuț Stelian Oprea (born 2 September 1972) is a retired Romanian football player, currently managing Moldova U-21.

References
 
 
 

1972 births
Living people
Sportspeople from Botoșani
Romanian footballers
Romanian expatriate footballers
ASC Oțelul Galați players
FCV Farul Constanța players
AFC Dacia Unirea Brăila players
Berliner FC Dynamo players
Győri ETO FC players
Liga I players
Liga II players
Nemzeti Bajnokság I players
Expatriate footballers in Hungary
Association football forwards